Sherman Oaks is a neighborhood in the city of Los Angeles, California located in the San Fernando Valley, founded in 1927. The neighborhood includes a portion of the Santa Monica Mountains, which gives Sherman Oaks a lower population density than some other areas in Los Angeles.

History

A partner of the Los Angeles Suburban Homes Company, Gen. Moses Hazeltine Sherman, developed Sherman Oaks. The company had subdivided  of land that would become Sherman Oaks. In 1927, each acre was sold for $780. Sherman's other major venture was the Los Angeles Pacific Railroad.

In 1991, a group of  homeowners living in the Chandler Estates area successfully petitioned former Los Angeles City Councilmember Zev Yaroslavsky to re-draw the boundaries of Sherman Oaks from Magnolia to Burbank Blvd to the north, and from Coldwater Canyon to Van Nuys Blvd to the west, with the goal of including their neighborhood. This request was nothing new to the San Fernando Valley; other neighborhoods had either sought to change their names, or sought to attach themselves onto more affluent neighborhoods. Residents in the area argued, however, that the area was originally part of Sherman Oaks, but was labeled Van Nuys instead through the creation of ZIP codes in 1962; a resident produced a property deed to buttress the case.

Just a few weeks after the Chandler Estates area successfully seceded from Van Nuys, Magnolia Woods, a 45 block area bordered by Van Nuys Boulevard on the east and the San Diego Freeway on the west, and between Burbank and Magnolia Boulevards, also successfully petitioned Los Angeles City council member Marvin Braude to secede from Van Nuys and join Sherman Oaks. Petitioners in the area argued that their neighborhood was also part of Sherman Oaks, though they were only able to produce 22 deeds showing so. As a result of this change, Van Nuys Middle School became separated from its namesake neighborhood.

Finally, in 2009, the Los Angeles City council voted to redraw neighborhood boundaries again to allow an area of about 1,800 homes in Van Nuys to be included.

The 1994 Northridge earthquake caused damage in the surrounding area. The Community Redevelopment Agency sought to manage the rebuilding efforts. The homeowners in the Sherman Oaks area later won a lawsuit to prevent the agency from managing efforts.

Geography and climate
The neighborhood is roughly bounded by Studio City to the east, Van Nuys to the north, Encino to the west, Bel Air and Beverly Hills Post Office to the south.

Demographics

2010
As of the 2010 census, according to the San Fernando Valley Almanac, Sherman Oaks had a population of 52,677 people and 25,255 households. The racial makeup of the neighborhood was 82% non-Hispanic white, 5% Asian American and 3% African American; 11% were Hispanic or Latino of any race. Other races made up less than 1%.

2000
The Los Angeles Times reported that the 2000 U.S. census counted 61,166 residents in the 9.15-square-mile Sherman Oaks neighborhood, including a wide swath of the Santa Monica Mountains—or 6,687 people per square mile, among the lowest population densities for the city. In 2008, the city estimated that the resident population had increased to 65,436.

In 2000, the percentages of residents aged 19 to 49 and 65 and older were among the county's highest. The percentages of divorced residents and of widows were among the county's highest. The average household size of two people was low when compared to the rest of the city and the county. Renters occupied 58.9% of the housing stock and house- or apartment-owners held 41.1%.

The neighborhood was considered "not especially diverse" ethnically within Los Angeles, with a high percentage of white residents. The breakdown was whites, 73.8%; Latinos, 11.8%; Asians, 5.7%; blacks, 4.4%; and others, 4.4%.  Iran (14.1%) and Mexico (8.8%) were the most common places of birth for the 26.2% of the residents who were born abroad—an average percentage for Los Angeles.

The neighborhood had a median household income of $69,651 in 2008, which was high for the city of Los Angeles but about average for the county as a whole. (Median household income reports the amount of money earned by the household that falls exactly in the middle of the pack.) The percentage of households that earned $125,000 and up was high for Los Angeles County.

Government and infrastructure

Local government
Los Angeles Fire Department operates Station 88 Sherman Oaks and Station 102 South Van Nuys/Valley Glen in Sherman Oaks. In addition the department operates Fire Station 78, which serves Sherman Oaks, in Studio City.

The Los Angeles Police Department operates the nearby Van Nuys Community Police Station at 6240 Sylmar Avenue, 91401, serving the community.

County, state, and federal representation
The United States Postal Service Sherman Oaks Post Office is located at 14900 Magnolia Boulevard.

Politics
Richard Close, the president of the Sherman Oaks Homeowners Association, said that in 1978 the neighborhood played a key role in the drive for Proposition 13 and in 2002 was the epicenter of an unsuccessful San Fernando Valley secession movement.

Education

Forty-five percent of Sherman Oaks residents aged 25 and older had earned a four-year degree by 2000, a high percentage for both the city and the county. The percentage of those residents with a master's degree or higher was also high for the County.

LAUSD schools within the Sherman Oaks boundary include:
 Van Nuys Middle School. The school was in the Van Nuys community until 1991, when City Council member Marvin Braude directed that a 45-block area that included the school be renamed as part of Sherman Oaks. The school continued to use the name "Van Nuys Middle".
 Kester Avenue Elementary School
 Chandler Elementary School
 Robert A. Millikan Middle School
 Sherman Oaks Elementary
 Dixie Canyon Avenue Elementary
 Riverside Drive Elementary School

Charter schools within the Sherman Oaks boundary include:
 Ivy Bound Academy for Math, Science, and Technology on Morrison Street
 Community Harvest Charter School, closed in 2012

Portions of Sherman Oaks, including Magnolia Woods, are zoned to Van Nuys High School in Van Nuys. Other portions are zoned to Grant High School in Valley Glen.

Scott Glover of the Los Angeles Times stated in 1993 "many Sherman Oaks residents do not have school-age children, and many others send their children to private schools".

Private schools include:
 Notre Dame High School
 The Buckley School
 Village Glen School

Libraries
Los Angeles Public Library operates the Sherman Oaks Branch, also known as the Sherman Oaks Martin Pollard Branch. The library was renamed in 1970, as a tribute to Martin Pollard, owner of the nearby Casa de Cadillac.

Parks and recreation
The Van Nuys Sherman Oaks Park is in Sherman Oaks. Dinah Eng of the Los Angeles Times wrote in 2002 that the park "is a popular site for family gatherings". The park has an auditorium, two lighted baseball diamonds, six unlighted baseball diamonds, lighted indoor basketball courts, lighted outdoor basketball courts, a children's play area, a 60-person community room, a lighted American football field, an indoor gymnasium without weights, picnic tables, a lighted soccer (football) field, and lighted tennis courts. Located in the same place as the park, the Van Nuys Sherman Oaks Pool is a seasonal outdoor heated swimming pool.

The Van Nuys Sherman Oaks Senior Citizen Center (also known as Bernardi Center), also on the park grounds, has an auditorium and multi-purpose room; its banquet capacity is 200 and its assembly capacity is 300. The senior center also has two community/meeting rooms; one can hold 50 people and one can hold 30 people. The senior center has two kitchens, a play area, a shuffle board place, a stage, and two storage rooms. The Van Nuys Sherman Oaks Tennis Courts facility in the Van Nuys Sherman Oaks Park has eight courts.

In addition, the city operates the Sherman Oaks Castle Park with arcade, batting cages, and miniature golf facilities, in Sherman Oaks.

Notable people 

 Paula Abdul, entertainer, singer, television personality 
 Baba Ali, comedian
 Rami Malek, actor
 Jennifer Aniston, actress, born in Sherman Oaks
 Drew Barrymore, actress
 Noah Beery Jr., actor
 LeVar Burton, actor
 June Christy, singer
 Andrew Dice Clay, comedian and actor
 James Dean, actor
 David Dobrik, YouTube personality
 Clint Eastwood, actor, film director
Michael Erush (born 1984), soccer player and coach
 Chip Esten, actor
 Joseph Gordon-Levitt, actor and filmmaker
 Ben Gottschalk (born 1992), NFL football offensive linesman
 Brian Grazer, film and television producer
 Melissa Joan Hart, actress
 Marsha Hunt (1917-2022), actress, model, and activist
 Jenn Im, YouTube personality 
 Michael B. Jordan, actor
Shia LaBeouf, actor
 Sondra Locke (1944–2018), actress, film director
 Demi Lovato, singer, songwriter, and actress
 Jeannie Mai, television personality, stylist, talk show host
 Jenna Marbles, YouTube personality
 Bridget Marquardt, actress
 Christopher Mayer, actor
 Duff McKagan, musician
 Tana Mongeau, YouTube personality
 Mary-Kate and Ashley Olsen, Elizabeth Olsen, actresses
 Bill Paparian, mayor of Pasadena, California
 Luke Perry (1966-2019), actor
 Yasiel Puig, baseball player
 Chuck Riley, voice actor 
 Jean Rogers, actor
 Herbert Ryman, Disney artist and imagineer.
 Charlie Sheen, actor
 Warren Stevens, actor
 Ryan Turell (born 1999), basketball player for the G-League Motor City Cruise, Yeshiva University.
 Daniel Van Meter, historian and inventor

In popular culture
The TV series Sherman Oaks appeared on the USA network from 1995 to 1997. It followed plastic surgeon Dr. Sanford Baker and his family as they were filmed by a young documentary filmmaker.

The series Never Have I Ever, and  Black-ish are set in Sherman Oaks.

In the TV series Two and a Half Men, Alan Harper owns a house in Sherman Oaks from where he is kicked out of.

References

External links

 Sherman Oaks Neighborhood Council
 Sherman Oaks Chamber of Commerce
 Sherman Oaks crime map and statistics, Los Angeles Times
 Colored map, Mapping L.A., Los Angeles Times
 View of Sherman Oaks valley, from a home on Round Valley Drive, Sherman Oaks, 1934. Los Angeles Times Photographic Archive (Collection 1429). UCLA Library Special Collections, Charles E. Young Research Library, University of California, Los Angeles.

 
Communities in the San Fernando Valley
Neighborhoods in Los Angeles
Populated places in the Santa Monica Mountains
Populated places established in 1927
1927 establishments in California